Bredbury and Romiley was an urban district in the administrative county of Cheshire, England from 1894 to 1974, which covered the civil parishes of Bredbury, Compstall and Romiley.

It was created by the Local Government Act 1894 from Bredbury and Romiley urban sanitary district. On the abolition of the administrative counties and the urban districts by the Local Government Act 1972 its area was included in the metropolitan borough of Stockport in the metropolitan county of Greater Manchester.

The socialist activist Christopher Thomas Douthwaite was a member of Bredbury and Romiley Urban District Council from 1911 to 1947.

References

Relationships / unit history of BREDBURY AND ROMILEY, A Vision of Britain through Time

Districts of England created by the Local Government Act 1894
Districts of England abolished by the Local Government Act 1972
Local government in the Metropolitan Borough of Stockport
History of Cheshire
History of the Metropolitan Borough of Stockport
Urban districts of England